Dan Riskin is an American entrepreneur and surgeon. As an expert in healthcare artificial intelligence, Riskin has promoted healthcare quality improvement and helped shape policy in the US and globally. Riskin's companies, featured in Forbes and The Wall Street Journal, have influenced the care of millions of patients. He continues to practice, teach, and perform research as Adjunct Professor of Surgery and Adjunct Professor of Biomedical Informatics Research at Stanford University.

Early life and education
Riskin was born on October 15, 1971 and grew up in Los Angeles, California. He began writing software at age 5, selling software at age 12, and winning regional awards in software programming during grammar school. As a teenager, Riskin studied at Brentwood High School, where he received the Bausch and Lomb Outstanding Scientist Award. He began college at age 16 as a Regent’s Scholar at University of California, San Diego. He received a medical degree from Boston University and completed surgery residency at University of California, Los Angeles and a critical care and acute care surgery fellowship at Stanford University. He earned an MBA with focus in bioinformatics and bioengineering at the Massachusetts Institute of Technology. Upon completion of his training in 2008, Riskin was promoted to Consulting Assistant Professor of Surgery at Stanford University.

Business 
While a student at MIT and Stanford in 2005, Riskin designed a painless wound closure device for which he later was issued US patents and FDA approval. 

Riskin cofounded Wadsworth Medical Technologies, which commercialized the product under the Dermaloc brand. The company was acquired by DQ Holdings and the product was rebranded DermaClip for sales in the US and China. The product has been used successfully on hundreds of thousands of patients.

In 2008, Riskin joined Mohr Davidow Ventures as Entrepreneur in Residence and the Obama Campaign Health Advisory Committee and the Health IT Subcommittee. He was subsequently funded by the National Institutes of Health and National Science Foundation to develop advanced technology to enable value-based healthcare. In 2011, Riskin founded and became CEO of Health Fidelity, a company which implements artificial intelligence to measure clinical quality and risk for value-based healthcare. As CEO, Riskin secured relationships with Harvard, Children’s Hospital of Philadelphia, and University of Pittsburgh Medical Center. He grew the company through three rounds of financing and transitioned company leadership on a $29 million round. Health Fidelity has become prominent in value-based healthcare, with one customer saying that Health Fidelity "added approximately $200 million in revenue" to their business.

After Health Fidelity, Riskin returned to public service, testifying on the 21st Century Cures Initiative in 2014. In Congressional retreat and briefings, he discussed approaches to leverage newly collected health data to refine the standard of care. Riskin was funded to pursue this work by the National Institutes of Health starting in 2015 and the National Science Foundation in 2018. This led to creation of Verantos, a company focused on using real world evidence to tailor therapy and support personalized medicine. As CEO, Riskin secured relationships with multiple top 10 biopharma firms and published on advanced scientific approaches for tailored therapy.

Policy and public service

Riskin has advocated a bipartisan approach to leverage clinical data to improve US healthcare quality. He described two decades of health data reform. The first, from 2010 - 2020, would institute electronic data capture and enable value-based healthcare. The second decade, from 2020 - 2030, would leverage the massive amounts of collected data to tailor therapy and enable personalized medicine.

Focusing on the first decade of healthcare data reform, capturing electronic information and improving value-based workflow, Riskin promoted a transition to electronic health records and use of data to improve care within the Obama Campaign Healthcare Advisory Committee starting in 2007. These efforts were enacted through the HITECH Act in 2009 and Affordable Care Act in 2010. Riskin's academic work "Re-examining health IT policy: What will it take to derive value from our investment?" encouraged national discussion on innovation and analytics. He founded and build a company, Health Fidelity, with a vision to capture accurate electronic information and improve value-based workflow.

Focusing on the second decade of healthcare data reform, tailoring therapy based on real world evidence, Riskin provided Congressional testimony in the 21st Century Cures Initiative in 2014. He met in Congressional retreat to help refine the law in 2015. The 21st Century Cures Act, passed in December 2016, included a pathway to incorporate real world evidence into regulatory decision-making. Riskin's academic work "Real world evidence in cardiovascular medicine: assuring data validity in electronic health record-based studies" described an approach to use advanced technology and data to enable credible real world evidence. He founded and built a company, Verantos, with a vision to refine the standard of care based on real world evidence.

Riskin has continued to focus national attention on healthcare quality as a member of the HHS Quality Measurement Task Force, in Centers for Medicare and Medicaid Services Grand Rounds, in FDA Grand Rounds and workshops, and through academic publication.

References

Living people
Businesspeople from Los Angeles
MIT Sloan School of Management alumni
1971 births